The Very Best of Fleetwood Mac is an enhanced compilation album released by British-American rock band Fleetwood Mac in 2002 to promote their then-upcoming album Say You Will (2003). It was released as a double album in the US on 12 October 2002 and as a single disc in the UK. It debuted on the Billboard 200 album chart at number 12 on 2 November 2002 and spent 42 weeks on the chart. It was certified gold on 12 November 2002, platinum on 10 January 2003, and later 4× Platinum on 11 September 2018, by the RIAA.

The US version contained the highly successful Californian era of Fleetwood Mac's work (1975 onwards). It also featured the B-side "Silver Springs", the previously unreleased The Dance performance of "Go Insane", and several rare single remixes of key tracks, such as "Rhiannon" and "Sisters of the Moon". The enhanced section contained rare live performances, interviews, music videos and footage of the band making their next album.

The UK version of 2002 was not enhanced, and contained three songs from the Peter Green-led blues era of Fleetwood Mac.

2009 re-release
In October 2009, the two-disc US version was released in the UK and many other territories in Europe, Australia and New Zealand, to coincide with the European and Australasian legs of the group's 'Unleashed' world tour. The re-released version features a different picture on the outer slipcase to previous releases, but does not contain the enhanced material of the 2002 US release.

The re-release has proven to be as successful in the UK as the previous 2002 release, and it re-entered the UK album chart at No. 6 (the 2002 edition had peaked at No. 7). Sales of both the 2002 edition and the 2009 edition combined have achieved 6× Platinum status (shipping of 1,800,000) by December 2018. The album has spent more than two years within the top 40, and 360 weeks in the UK Top 100 by December 2018. The album sold over 89,000 copies in the UK in 2013 having reached as high as #34 on the album chart earlier in the year.

The Very Best  reached No. 1 on the Australian ARIA Catalogue Chart in December 2009, and achieved platinum status in New Zealand within only five weeks of release.

Track listing

UK track listing 2002 release

US 2002 and UK 2009 track listing

Charts

Weekly charts

Year-end charts

Decade-end charts

Certifications

References

External links
Entry on FleetwoodMac.net

2002 greatest hits albums
Albums produced by Greg Ladanyi
Fleetwood Mac compilation albums
Reprise Records compilation albums